Baro Vatra is a village in Gopalganj District, Bangladesh, part of Muksudpur Upazila. The village covers an area of 3.43 km2, and is bordered by the villages of Nanikhir, Nawkhanda, Pathorgatha and Banagram. Baro Vatra's main canal is the Nawkhanda Khall or Nanikhir Khall. The Bil Rout Canal at Jalirpar joins with the main canal, flowing into the river Padma.

Baro Vatra under Nanikhir Union parishad was established in 1634. The village consists of three wards and five mahallas. The village has a primary school, six mosques, a madrasa, and three community schools. and a famous Kaliardah Bill. The village is also home to the Nanikhir Union health complex, a family planning center, and a Nanikhir Government hospital.

Non-governmental organizations operating in Baro Vatra include BDAO (the Bangladesh Development Acceleration Organisation), BRAC, CCDB, ASA, World Vision, and HCCB.

History
In May 1971, Pakistani fighter planes attacked the village. with the help of a few Razakar. Two residents were killed and a motor launch was damaged. On 9 August 1971, about 200 freedom fighters in collaboration with the local people liberated Muksudpur. On 12 October 1971 the freedom fighters battled the Pakistani army. In the battle, 22members of the Pakistani army and Razakars were killed. In another direct encounter near Diknagar bridge 30 members of the Pakistani army and three freedom fighters were killed.

Demographics
Baro Vatra has a population of 2500, 58.65% male and 47.35% female, and a population density of 728 per km2. The literacy rate among the villagers is 87.80%.

The main occupations of residents of Baro Vatra are: Agriculture (43.09%), Agricultural labourer (23.45%), wage labor (2.21%), commerce (10.10%), service (7.69%), fishing (1.71%), industry (1.11%), hawking (2.32%), construction (1.39%), and 6.93% other.

Agriculture
The main crops grown in Baro Vatra are paddy, wheat, jute, sugarcane, onion, garlic, betel leaf, vegetables and sweet potato. Formerly, the village grew linseed, sesame, indigo, china, and kaun, but these are rarely grown anymore.

Baro Vatra also produces the fruits mango, jackfruit, papaya, palm, guava, lemon, litchi, coconut, guava, and banana.

There are fisheries, hatcheries, poultry and dairy farms in Baro Vatra. Some fishermen depend on the waters of the Hatashe channel for their livelihood.

References

Populated places in Dhaka Division